Jindřich Rezek (31 January 1884 – 14 August 1940) was a Bohemian international footballer. His is a midfielder in his football team.

References

External links

1884 births
1940 deaths
Association football midfielders
Czech footballers
Czech Republic international footballers
AC Sparta Prague players
Bohemia international footballers
Sportspeople from the Austro-Hungarian Empire